Himiko is a large gas cloud found at redshift of z=6.6 that predates similar Lyman-alpha blobs. At the time of its discovery in 2009, researchers said it "may represent the most massive object ever discovered in the early universe". It is located in Cetus at redshift z=6.595, about 12.9 billion light years from Earth, or about  miles ( kilometers).

Characteristics
This nebular gas cloud is thought to be a protogalaxy, caught in the act of formation. There have been no spectroscopic signatures of anything other than hydrogen or helium, and its luminance cannot be ascribed to gravitational lensing, black holes or exterior excitation. The lack of any chemical signatures other than hydrogen and helium illustrate the extreme primitiveness of the object, and early enough so as not to be polluted by carbon signatures from young stars.

Size
It is 55,000 light years across (half the diameter of our galaxy), and at the time of discovery, said to "hold more than 10 times as much mass as the next largest object found in the early universe, or roughly the equivalent mass of 40 billion Suns".

Discovery
Masami Ouchi, a researcher at the Carnegie Institution in Pasadena, California, stated "I have never heard about any [similar] objects that could be resolved at this distance...[i]t's kind of record-breaking."

Name
The object was named by a Japanese scientist after the 3rd-century Japanese shaman queen Himiko.

References

Further reading

External links 
 SIMBAD, "NAME Himiko" (accessed 12 April 2010)

Physical cosmology
Lyman-alpha blobs
Cetus (constellation)